In telecommunication, a dial plan (or dialing plan) establishes the permitted sequences of digits dialed by telephone subscriber and the manner in which a telephone switch interprets these digits within the definitions of the prevailing telephone numbering plan.  Dial plans in the public switched telephone network (PSTN) have traditionally been more commonly referred to as dialing procedures.

The collection of permissible digit patterns, so called digit-maps, for a private telephone system or for customer premise equipment, such as an analog telephone adapter (ATA) or an IP phone, is sometimes also called dial plan.  A pattern may be as short as a single digit, e.g. for reaching an operator, or as long as a complete international telephone number, including trunk prefixes and international prefixes.

Public switched telephone network (USA)
Local numbers consist of seven digits within a numbering plan area with a single area code. For overlay numbering plans the area code must dialed before the local telephone number.
Long distance dialing requires the dialing of 1, the three-digit area code, and the seven-digit local number.
International numbers of any length are dialing starting with 011.

Similarly, telephony service operators may provide dialing sequences for special services, such as directory assistance and emergency services.

Private telephone systems
PBX equipment, carrier switching systems, or end-user telephones may specify a variable-length dial plan or a fixed-length dial plan.
In private branch exchanges in the U.S. a dialing plan may specify the addresses of internal extension, as numbers of two, three, or four digits.

Dialing telephone numbers of the PSTN often requires the dialing of 9 on PBX systems to reach an outside line.

Digit maps
Analog telephone adapters, IP phones, and many other VoIP media gateways have configuration options that establish the digit sequences that can be dialed with the equipment. The dial plan of these devices is established by a digit map.
The following syntax may be used for such dial plan, as adapted from RFC 2705,<ref>RFC 2705, Media Gateway Control Protocol (MGCP) Version 1.0, Arango et al. (1999)</ref> the specification for the Media Gateway Control Protocol.

 

Some dial plan'' examples using the above syntax look as follows:

References

Telephone numbers